The Wackersdorf nuclear reprocessing plant (abbreviated WAA Wackersdorf) is a reprocessing plant in Wackersdorf in Bavaria, Germany. Because of protests the plant was never completed. Today it is an industrial site with no special features.

Anti-WAA protest 
In the early 1980s plans to build a nuclear fuel reprocessing plant in the Bavarian town of Wackersdorf led to major protests. In 1986, peaceful protests as well as heavy confrontations between West German police armed with stun grenades, rubber bullets, water cannons, CS gas and CN-gas and demonstrators of which some were armed with slingshots, crowbars and Molotov cocktails took place at multiple occasions at the site of a nuclear reprocessing plant in Wackersdorf. The plans for the plant were abandoned in 1988. It is still unclear whether protests or plant economics or the death of the Minister-President of the state of Bavaria Franz Josef Strauß 1988 led to the decision.

The Anti-WAAhnsinns Festivals were political rock concerts which took place in Germany in the 1980s. (The name is a pun on WAA and Wahnsinn = madness.) Their purpose was to support protests against a planned nuclear reprocessing plant in Wackersdorf. In 1986, the fifth festival marked the peak of the protest movement against the plant.

Protest Monuments 

To this day there are still some monuments to the WAA resistance:
 Francis shrine (chapel) with the "Cross of Wackersdorf"At the shrine in the mid-1980s, WAA opponents met every Sunday at 14:00 for an ecumenical prayer and then moved into the area or to the hoarding. This is the same place where today the "Marterlgemeinde" meet four times a year to a prayer: at the Chernobyl- and Hiroshima-commemoration in memory of the shrine's saint Francis of Assisi on 3 October and on Christmas Eve.
 Anti-WAAhnsinns Festival plaque at Lanzenanger in Burglengenfeld
 Anti-WAA ex-voto in the Church of Our Lady at Kreuzberg, Schwandorf
 WAA resistance memorial in front of the lake facilities, Bregenz Festspielhaus

 WAA resistance memorial in Salzburg (Austria)

Documentary films 
Some German documentaries about WAA were filmed.
 :de:WAAhnsinn – Der Wackersdorf-Film (documentary film 1986) 
 :de:Spaltprozesse (Fission processes - Wackersdorf 001: documentary film 1987) 
 :de:Restrisiko (Dokumentarfilm) (The Remaining Risk or the Arrogance of Power: documentary film 1989) 
 :de:Das achte Gebot (1991) (The Eighth Commandment: documentary film against nuclear energy 1991) 
 :de:Halbwertszeiten (Half-lifes: documentary film 2006) 
 :de:Albtraum Atommüll (The Nightmare of Nuclear Waste: ARTE-documentary film 2009 about the fate of nuclear waste and about the dangers of nuclear energy) 
 WAA Wackersdorf: Strahlende Zukunft für die Oberpfalz (WAA Wackersdorf: A Radiant Future for the Upper Palatinate: Monitor-documentary 1986 by Gabriele Krone-Schmalz, Ekkehard Sieker, Helge Cramer) 
 18 Tage freies Wackerland (The 18 Days of the Free Wacker Land: Medienwerkstatt Franken, Bibliothek des Widerstands Band 19, BellaStoria Film)  
 Schreckgespenst WAA – Widerstand in Wackersdorf (The WAA Heartburn: Resistance in Wackersdorf: Medienwerkstatt Franken, Bibliothek des Widerstands Band 19, BellaStoria Film) 
 WAA-Schlachten (WAA Battles: Medienwerkstatt Franken, Bibliothek des Widerstands Band 19, BellaStoria Film) 
 Wackersdorf - ein Mythos? Was ist aus den WAA-Kämpfern von einst geworden? (Wackersdorf - a myth? What happened to the former WAA fighters? Medienwerkstatt Franken) 
 Lieber heute aktiv als morgen radioaktiv (Better active today than radioactive tomorrow: contribution by Lars Friedrich in the TV magazine ttt – titel, thesen, temperamente)  
 Zaunkämpfe (Fighting at the Fence: Medienwerkstatt Franken 1988, BellaStoria Film) 
 Kirche unterstützt Mahnwache am Wackersdorfdenkmal (The Church supports the picket at the Wackersdorf memorial, Salzburger Nachrichten) 
 Der Fahrradspeichenfabrikkomplex (The Complex of the Bicycle Spoke Factory: Hörbuch-Feature 2010 von Angela Kreuz und Dieter Lohr)
Many other films and documentaries are available at "WAA Wackersdorf" on video portals such as Vimeo or YouTube.

See also

 Anti-nuclear movement in Germany
 Armin Weiss - Anti WAA-Wackersdorf activist
 Hildegard Breiner - Anti WAA-Wackersdorf activist

References

Anti–nuclear power movement
Anti-nuclear movement in Germany
Nuclear reprocessing
Nuclear technology in Germany
Schwandorf (district)